Darfur is a region of western Sudan. Dār is an Arabic word meaning "home [of]" – the region was named Dardaju while ruled by the Daju, who migrated from Meroë , and it was  renamed Dartunjur when the Tunjur ruled the area. Darfur was an independent sultanate for several hundred years until it was incorporated into Sudan by Anglo-Egyptian forces in 1916. As an administrative region, Darfur is divided into five federal states: Central Darfur, East Darfur, North Darfur, South Darfur and West Darfur. Because of the War in Darfur between Sudanese government forces and the indigenous population, the region has been in a state of humanitarian emergency and genocide since 2003. The factors include religious and ethnic rivalry, and the rivalry between farmers and herders.

The first historical mention of the word Fur occurs in 1664 in the account by J. M. Vansleb, a German traveler, of a visit to Egypt (Petermann (1862-3). Mittheilungen, Erganzungsband II). It is claimed that, like sūdān, fūr means "blacks", and was the name given by the early light-colored Berber sultans of Darfur to the original inhabitants of the country such as the Binga, Banda, etc. As the historic dynasty's physical appearance became more "Africanized" from intermarriage with black wives and concubines, the appearance of the sultans darkened correspondingly and they became known by the appellation of their subjects, Fūr.

Geography

The region's main towns are Al Fashir, Geneina, and Nyala.

There are four main features of its physical geography. The whole eastern half of Darfur is covered with plains and low hills of sandy soils, known as goz, and sandstone hills. In many places the goz is waterless and can only be inhabited where there are water reservoirs or deep boreholes. While dry, goz may also support rich pasture and arable land. To the north the goz is overtaken by the desert sands of the Sahara. A second feature are the wadis, which range from seasonal watercourses that flood only occasionally during the wet season to large wadis that flood for most of the rains and flow from western Darfur hundreds of kilometres west to Lake Chad. Many wadis have pans of alluvium with rich heavy soil that are also difficult to cultivate. Western Darfur is dominated by the third feature, basement rock, sometimes covered with a thin layer of sandy soil. Basement rock is too infertile to be farmed, but provides sporadic forest cover that can be grazed by animals. The fourth and final feature are the Marrah Mountains and Daju Hills, volcanic plugs created by a massif, that rise up to a peak at Deriba crater where there is a small area of temperate climate, high rainfall and permanent springs of water.

Remote sensing has detected the imprint of a vast underground lake under Darfur. It may have dried up thousands of years ago.

History

Most of the region consists of a semi-arid plain and thus appears unsuitable for developing a large and complex civilization. But the Marrah Mountains offer plentiful water, and by the 12th century the Daju people, succeeding the semi-legendary Tora culture, created the first historical attestable kingdom. They were centered in the Marrah Mountains and left records of valuable rock engravings, stone architecture and a (orally preserved) list of kings. The Tunjur replaced the Daju in the fourteenth century and the Daju established new headquarters in Abyei, Denga, Darsila and Mongo in the current Chad. The Tunjur sultans intermarried with the Fur and sultan Musa Sulayman (reigned c.1667 to c.1695) is considered the founder of the Keira dynasty. Darfur became a great power of the Sahel under the Keira dynasty, expanding its borders as far east as the Atbarah River and attracting immigrants from Bornu and Bagirmi. During the mid-18th century conflict between rival factions wracked the country, and external war pitted Darfur against Sennar and Wadai. In 1875, the weakened kingdom was destroyed by the Egyptian ruler set up in Khartoum, largely through the machinations of Sebehr Rahma, a slave-trader, who was competing with the dar over access to ivory in Bahr el Ghazal to the south of Darfur.

The Darfuris were restive under Egyptian rule, but were no more predisposed to accept the rule of the self-proclaimed Mahdi, Muhammad Ahmad, when in 1882 his Emir of Darfur, who came from the Southern Darfur Arab Rizeigat tribe led by Sheikh Madibbo, defeated the Ottoman forces led by Slatin Pasha (that had just invaded Egypt earlier that year) in Darfur. When Ahmad's successor, Abdallahi ibn Muhammad, himself an Arab of Southern Darfur from the Ta’isha tribe, demanded that the pastoralist tribes provide soldiers, several tribes rose up in revolt. Following the defeat of Abdallahi at Omdurman in 1899 by an Anglo-Egyptian expeditionary force, the new Anglo-Egyptian government recognized Ali Dinar as the sultan of Darfur and largely left the Dar to its own affairs except for a nominal annual tribute. In 1916, after the British government suspected that the sultan was falling under the influence of the Ottoman government, launched an expedition from Egypt to capture and annex Darfur into the Anglo-Egyptian Sudan. The colonial government directed financial and administrative resources to the tribes of central Sudan near Khartoum - while the outlying regions such as Darfur remained mostly forgotten and ignored.

Under Sudanese rule

A pattern of skewed economic development continued after Sudan achieved political independence in 1956. The proxy wars between Sudan, Libya and Chad added an element of political instability.  Darfurians, mainly those who self-identified as "Arab" and "African" people, began to respond to the ideology of Arab supremacy propagated by Libyan leader Muammar al-Gaddafi (in power 1969–2011). A famine in the mid-1980s disrupted many societal structures and led to the first significant modern fighting amongst Darfuris. A low-level conflict continued for the next fifteen years, with the government co-opting and arming Arab Janjaweed militias against its enemies. The fighting reached a peak in 2003 with the beginning of the Darfur conflict, in which the resistance coalesced into a roughly cohesive rebel movement. Human-rights groups and the UN, March, 2004, came to regard the conflict  as one of the worst humanitarian disasters in the world. Insurgency and counter-insurgency have led to 480,000 deaths (the Khartoum government disputes the numbers). This has been labeled as Darfur genocide. "By 2010 about 300,000 had died, according to the UN best estimate, and about 3,000,000 were forced into refugee camps." Over 2.8 million people have become displaced since 2003, many of whom were children (see Lost Boys of Sudan). Many of these refugees have gone into camps where emergency aid has created conditions that, although extremely basic, are better than in the villages, which offer no protection against the various militias that operate in the region.

Nearly two-thirds of the population continues to struggle to survive in remote villages. Virtually no foreigners visit the region because of the fear of kidnapping, and only some non-governmental organizations continue to provide long-term grass-roots assistance.  the United Nations is in discussion with the Government of Sudan over the withdrawal of UNAMID, the peacekeeping force, which is the largest in the world.  Other UN agencies (such as the WFP) might exit.

During the existence of the Calais Jungle refugee camp, Darfur was listed as a major source of the camp's inhabitants.

Peace process

Darfur Peace Agreement (also known as Abuja Agreement)

The Government of Sudan and the Sudan Liberation Movement of Minni Minnawi signed a Darfur Peace Agreement in 2006. Only one rebel group, the Sudan Liberation Movement, subscribed to the agreement; the Justice and Equality Movement rejected it, resulting in a continuation of the conflict. The agreement includes provisions for wealth-sharing and power-sharing and established a Transitional Darfur Regional Authority to help administer Darfur until a referendum could take place on the future of the region. The leader of the Sudan Liberation Movement, Minni Minnawi, was appointed Senior Assistant to the President of Sudan and Chairman of the transitional authority in 2007..

Doha Agreement
In December 2010, representatives of the Liberation and Justice Movement, an umbrella organisation of ten rebel groups, formed in February of that year, started a fresh round of talks with the Sudanese Government in Doha, Qatar. A new rebel group, the Sudanese Alliance Resistance Forces in Darfur, was formed and the Justice and Equality Movement planned further talks. The talks ended on December 19 without a new peace agreement, but participants agreed on basic principles, including a regional authority and a referendum on autonomy for Darfur. The possibility of a Darfuri Vice-President was also discussed.

In January 2011, the leader of the Liberation and Justice Movement, Dr. Tijani Sese, stated that the movement had accepted the core proposals of the Darfur peace document proposed by the joint-mediators in Doha; the proposals included a $300,000,000 compensation package for victims of atrocities in Darfur and special courts to conduct trials of persons accused of human-rights violations. Proposals for a new Darfur Regional Authority were also included; this authority would have an executive council of 18 ministers and would remain in place for five years. The current three Darfur states and state governments would also continue to exist during this period. In February 2011 the Sudanese Government rejected the idea of a single region headed by a vice-president from the region.

On 29 January, the leaders of the Liberation and Justice Movement and the Justice and Equality Movement issued a joint statement affirming their commitment to the Doha negotiations and agreement to attend the Doha forum on 5 February. The Sudanese government had not yet agreed to attend the forum on that date and instead favoured an internal peace process without the involvement of rebel groups. Later in February, the Sudanese Government agreed to return to the Doha peace forum with a view to complete a new peace agreement by the end of that month. On 25 February, both the Liberation and Justice Movement and the Justice and Equality Movement announced that they had rejected the peace document proposed by the mediators in Doha. The main sticking points were the issues of a Darfuri vice-president and compensation for victims. The Sudanese government had not commented on the peace document.

At the Doha Peace Forum in June, the Joint Mediators proposed a new Darfur Peace Agreement, which would supersede the Abuja Agreement of 2005 and if signed, would halt preparations for a Darfur status referendum. The proposal included provisions for a Darfuri Vice-President and an administrative structure that includes both the three states and a strategic regional authority, the Darfur Regional Authority, to oversee Darfur as a whole. The new agreement was signed by the Government of Sudan and the Liberation and Justice Movement on 14 July. The Sudan Liberation Movement and the Justice and Equality Movement did not sign the new document at that time but had three months in which to do so if they wished.

2020 peace agreement (Juba Agreement)
A comprehensive peace agreement was signed on 31 August 2020 in Juba, South Sudan, between the Sudanese authorities and rebel factions to end armed hostilities. 

However, further tribal clashes have continued during 2021.

Languages
Languages of Darfur include Fur, Daju, Erenga (or Sungor), Fongoro, Fulbe (or Fulfulde), Fur (thus the name of the region), Masalit, Sinyar, Tama, Midob, and Zaghawa.

Other than Fur, the following languages are spoken in Darfur according to Ethnologue.

Fur language
Maban languages
Masalit language
Taman languages
Tama language
Sungor language
Saharan languages
Zaghawa language
Kanuri language (Bornu)
Berti language [extinct]
Kresh languages
Gbaya language
Bongo-Bagirmi languages
Tar Gula language
Yulu language

Berber languages
Air Tamajeq language
Daju languages
Daju language
Baygo language [extinct]
Nubian languages
Midob language
Birked language [extinct]
Other languages
Fulfulde language
Sinyar language [extinct]
Fongoro language [extinct]

Government

The region is divided into five federal states: Central Darfur, East Darfur, North Darfur, South Darfur and West Darfur. The Darfur Peace Agreement of 2006 established a Transitional Darfur Regional Authority as an interim authority for the region. The agreement stated that a referendum on the status of Darfur should be held no later than 2011. Minni Minnawi was the first chair of this authority, holding that office from April 2007 until December 2010, when he was succeeded by Shartai Jaafar Abdel Hakam. The peace agreement that was signed in July 2011 saw the Transitional Darfur Regional Authority reconstituted as the Darfur Regional Authority with executive and legislative functions. The chairperson of the Darfur Regional Authority, Tijani Sese, assumed the post on 20 September 2011. The regional authority was dissolved in July 2016 following a referendum, on the status of the Darfur region within Sudan. As part of the Sudanese transition to democracy, a Darfur Regional Government was created in August 2021 with Minni Minawi as Regional Governor.

Demographics and economy
In 2008, Darfur's population was 7.5 million. This in an increase by nearly six times from 1973 (1.3 million). 52% are aged 16 years or younger.

Darfur's budget was US$286 million in 2008.

See also

 2010 Sahel famine
 Ahmed Abdulshafi Bassey
 Darfur genocide

References

Bibliography
 Arkell, A. J., "A History of Darfur. Part II: The Tunjur etc", Sudan Notes and Records, 32, 2 (1951), 207–238.
 Asher, M.J.,"In Search of the Forty Days Road"  Penguin. 1984
 Daly, M.W., Darfur's Sorrow: A History of Destruction and Genocide, Cambridge 2010.
 Elliesie, Hatem, "Sudan under the Constraints of (International) Human Rights Law and Humanitarian Law: The Case of Darfur", in Hatem Elliesie (ed.), Islam and Human Rights / al-islam wa-huquq al-insan, Frankfurt, Berlin, Bern, Bruxelles, New York, Oxford, Vienna 2010, pp. 193–217 
 Elliesie, Hatem et al., "Different Approaches to Genocide Trials under National Jurisdiction on the African Continent: The Rwandan, Ethiopian and Sudanese Cases", in Recht in Afrika, Cologne 2009, 12/1, pp. 21–67. 
 Foerstel, K. "Crisis in Darfur" CQ Global Researcher (2008). 2, 243-270. online
 Herr, Alexis, Darfur Genocide: The Essential Reference Guide (2020) excerpt
  Johnson, Douglas H. The Root Causes of Sudan's Civil Wars (Indiana UP, 2003), ISBN 0-253-21584-6
 Kiernan, Ben. Blood and Soil: A World History of Genocide and Extermination from Sparta to Darfur (2009) excerpt
 O'Fahey, R. S., The Darfur Sultanate: A History, London 2008.
 Young, Osman, Abusin, Asher, Egemi  "Livelihoods, Power, and Choice: The Vulnerability of the Northern Rizaygat, Darfur, Sudan"  Feinstein Centre for Marginalized Peoples. Tufts University January 2009

External links
Darfur Regional Government
Darfur Regional Government on Facebook

 
Regions of Sudan
Former countries in Africa